The 1969–70 Segunda División season was the 39th since its establishment and was played between 6 September 1969 and 7 June 1970.

Overview before the season
20 teams joined the league, including 3 relegated from the 1968–69 La Liga and 6 promoted from the 1968–69 Tercera División.

Relegated from La Liga
Málaga
Español
Córdoba

Promoted from Tercera División'''

Orense
Bilbao Atlético
Osasuna
San Andrés
Castellón
Salamanca

Teams

League table

Top goalscorers

Top goalkeepers

Results

Relegation playoffs

First leg

Second leg

Tiebreaker

External links
BDFútbol

Segunda División seasons
2
Spain